was a  after Kangi and before Tenpuku. This period spanned the years from April 1232 to April 1233.

Change of era
 1232 :  The era name was changed to mark an event or a number of events. The previous era ended and a new one commenced in Kangi 4.

Events of the Jōei Era
 1232 (Jōei 1, i2nd month): Kujō Yoritsune is raised to the second rank of the 3rd class in the dōjō kuge.
 1232 (Jōei 1, 11th month): In the 11th year of Emperor Go-Horikawa's reign (後堀河天皇11年), he abdicated; and the succession (senso) was received by his oldest son. Shortly thereafter, Emperor Shijō is said to have acceded to the throne (sokui).

Notes

References
 Nussbaum, Louis-Frédéric and Käthe Roth. (2005).  Japan encyclopedia. Cambridge: Harvard University Press. ;  OCLC 58053128
 Titsingh, Isaac. (1834). Nihon Odai Ichiran; ou,  Annales des empereurs du Japon.  Paris: Royal Asiatic Society, Oriental Translation Fund of Great Britain and Ireland. OCLC 5850691
 Varley, H. Paul. (1980). A Chronicle of Gods and Sovereigns: Jinnō Shōtōki of Kitabatake Chikafusa. New York: Columbia University Press. ;  OCLC 6042764

External links
 National Diet Library, "The Japanese Calendar" -- historical overview plus illustrative images from library's collection

Japanese eras
1230s in Japan